The Writers’ Museum, housed in Lady Stair's House at the Lawnmarket on the Royal Mile in Edinburgh, presents the lives of three of the foremost Scottish writers: Robert Burns, Walter Scott and Robert Louis Stevenson. Run by the City of Edinburgh Council, the collection includes portraits, works and personal objects. Beside the museum lies the Makars' Court, the country's emerging national literary monument.

Gallery

See also
 List of museums in Scotland

References

External links

 Official website

Museums in Edinburgh
Literary museums in Scotland
Royal Mile
Robert Burns
Walter Scott
Robert Louis Stevenson
Biographical museums in Scotland
Museums dedicated to Robert Louis Stevenson